Henry Reynolds,  (born 1 March 1938) is an Australian historian whose primary work has focused on the frontier conflict between European settlers in Australia and Indigenous Australians.

Education and career

Reynolds received a state school education in Hobart, Tasmania, from 1944 to 1954. Following this, he attended the University of Tasmania, where he graduated with a Bachelor of Arts with Honours in History in 1960, later gaining a Master of Arts in 1964. He received an Honorary Doctor of Letters degree from his alma mater, the University of Tasmania, in 1998 and another from James Cook University in 2015.

He taught in secondary schools in Australia and England, later establishing the Australian History programme at Townsville University College, where he accepted a lectureship in 1965, later serving as an associate professor of History and Politics from 1982 until his retirement in 1998. He then took up an Australian Research Council post as a professorial fellow at the University of Tasmania in Launceston, and subsequently a post at the university's Riawunna Centre for Aboriginal Education. He currently serves as Honorary Research Professor in the university's School of Humanities.

Henry Reynolds is married to Margaret Reynolds (née Lyne), an ALP Senator for Queensland in Federal Parliament (1983 until 1999). Their daughter is Anna Reynolds, the Lord Mayor of Hobart.

Historical research

In more than ten books and numerous academic articles Reynolds has explained the high level of violence and conflict involved in the colonisation of Australia, and the Aboriginal resistance to numerous massacres of indigenous people. Reynolds, and other historians, estimate that up to 3,000 Europeans and at least 20,000 Aboriginal Australians were killed directly in the frontier violence, and many more Aboriginal peoples died indirectly through the introduction of European diseases and starvation caused by being forced from their productive tribal lands.

Geoffrey Blainey and Keith Windschuttle categorise his approach as a "black armband view" of Australian history. Reynolds has been quoted as responding to this claim as follows – better a black armband than a white blindfold. His books are based on evidence available in archives and recorded during frontier times, and have been instrumental in overturning previously held views prevalent in the late 20th century that settlement was peaceful. He has also however shown that in earlier times – pre 1900 – white Australians were well aware of the violence against the Aboriginal peoples and believed they were a 'dying race'.

In 2002, historian and journalist, Keith Windschuttle, in his book The Fabrication of Aboriginal History, Volume One: Van Diemen's Land 1803–1847, disputed whether the colonial settlers of Australia committed widespread genocide against indigenous Australians, especially focussing on the Black War in Tasmania, and denied the claims by historians such as Reynolds and Professor Lyndall Ryan that there was a campaign of guerrilla warfare against British settlement. He accused Reynolds of inventing evidence and making many claims without any documentary support at all. Subsequently, in Whitewash: on Keith Windschuttle's fabrication of Aboriginal history it was argued that Windschuttle failed to meet the criteria that he used to assess 'orthodox historians' and thus his accusations of deliberately and extensively misrepresenting, misquoting, exaggerating and fabricating evidence were flawed.

Friendship with Eddie Mabo
Reynolds struck up a friendship with Eddie Mabo, who was then a groundsman and gardener at James Cook University. In his book Why Weren't We Told?, Reynolds describes the talks they had regarding Mabo's people's rights to their lands, on Murray Island, in the Torres Strait. Reynolds writes:
Eddie [...] would often talk about his village and about his own land, which he assured us would always be there when he returned because everyone knew it belonged to his family. His face shone when he talked of his village and his land.

So intense and so obvious was his attachment to his land that I began to worry about whether he had any idea at all about his legal circumstances. [...] I said something like: "You know how you've been telling us about your land and how everyone knows it's Mabo land? Don't you realise that nobody actually owns land on Murray Island? It's all crown land."

He was stunned. [...] How could the whitefellas question something so obvious as his ownership of his land?

Reynolds looked into the issue of indigenous land ownership in international law, and encouraged Mabo to take the matter to court. "It was there over the sandwiches and tea that the first step was taken which led to the Mabo judgement in June 1992." Mabo then talked to lawyers, and Reynolds "had little to do with the case itself from that time", although he and Mabo remained friends until the latter's death in January 1992.

Awards and honours
Henry Reynolds has received the following awards and honours:
1970–71 British Council Travelling Scholarship
1982 Ernest Scott Historical Prize for The Other Side of the Frontier
1986 Harold White Fellowship, National Library of Australia
1988 Human Rights and Equal Opportunity Commission Arts Award for The Law of the Land
1996 Australian Book Council Award: the Banjo Award for non-fiction
1998 Doctor of Letters (honoris causa), University of Tasmania
1999 Fellow of the Academy of the Social Sciences in Australia (FASSA)
1999 Fellow of the Australian Academy of the Humanities (FAHA)
1999 Human Rights Commission Arts Non-Fiction Award
2000 Queensland Premier's Literary Awards Literary Work Advancing Public Debate – the Harry Williams Award for Why Weren't We Told?
2000 Australian Humanist of the Year Award
2008 with Professor Marilyn Lake, Queensland Premier's Literary Awards History Book Award for Drawing the Global Colour Line
2009 with Marilyn Lake the non-fiction category of the Prime Minister's Literary Awards for Drawing the Global Colour Line

Conference 
In tribute to Reynolds' seventieth year, the conference Race, Nation, History: A Conference in Honour of Henry Reynolds was held in August 2008. It was sponsored by the Australian National University's Research School of the Humanities and the Research School of the Social Sciences, the National Library of Australia and the University of Tasmania. Selected papers from the conference were published in a volume by Australian Scholarly Publishing, but do not appear to be otherwise available.

Major works
Aborigines and Settlers: the Australian Experience, 1788–1939 (ed) (1972) 
The Other Side of the Frontier : Aboriginal Resistance to the European Invasion of Australia (1981) 
Frontier; Aborigines, Settlers and Land (1987) 
Dispossession; Black Australia and White Invaders (1989) 
With the White People (1990) 
Race Relations in North Queensland (1993) (ed) 
Aboriginal Sovereignty: Reflections on Race, State and Nation (1996) 
This Whispering in Our Hearts (1998) 
Why Weren't We Told? (2000) 
Black Pioneers (2000) 
An Indelible Stain? The Question of Genocide in Australia's History (2001) 
The Law Of The Land (2003) 
Fate of a Free People (2004) 
Drawing the Global Colour Line: White Men's Countries and the International Challenge of Racial Equality (2008) 
 Marilyn Lake and Henry Reynolds (eds.), What's Wrong with ANZAC? The Militarisation of Australian History, Sydney, NewSouth Books, 2010. 
A History of Tasmania (2011) 
Forgotten War (2013, NewSouth Books) 
Unnecessary Wars (2016, NewSouth Books) 
Truth Telling: History, sovereignty and the Uluru Statement (2021, NewSouth Books) 
Tongerlongeter: First Nations Leader & Tasmanian War Hero. With Nicholas Clements (2021, NewSouth Books)

References

External links
Henry Reynolds, ARC Senior Research Fellow, School of History & Classics at the University of Tasmania
Aboriginal Sorcery with Professor Henry Reynolds Podcast interview on La Trobe University website.

1938 births
Australian historians
Fellows of the Academy of the Social Sciences in Australia
Fellows of the Australian Academy of the Humanities
Historians of Australia
History of Indigenous Australians
James Cook University alumni
Academic staff of James Cook University
Living people
People from Hobart
University of Tasmania alumni
Academic staff of the University of Tasmania